John Capgrave (21 April 1393 – 12 August 1464) was an English historian, hagiographer and scholastic theologian, remembered chiefly for Nova Legenda Angliae (New Reading from England). This was the first comprehensive collection of lives of the English saints.

Schooling
Capgrave was born in Bishop's Lynn, now King's Lynn, Norfolk: "My cuntre is Northfolke, of the town of Lynne" (Life of St Katharine, p. 16). His parents are unknown but he may have been the nephew of a namesake who obtained a doctorate of theology at Oxford in 1390 and was also an Augustinian friar. Capgrave the younger joined the order at Lynn in about 1410 and was ordained in 1416 or 1417. He then studied theology at the order's school in London. By 1421, he was a lector, qualified to teach at all but one of the order's levels of schooling. He was then sent by the prior-general for further studies in Cambridge, where he delivered his examinatory sermon in Latin in 1422. He later wrote an English version of this as his treatise on the twelve orders that follow the rule of St Augustine. His progress from ordination to the degree of master of theology is said to have been the fastest recorded.

Works
Capgrave's earliest work was a Life of St Norbert in English from some time before 1422. There followed a succession of exegeses, many of them now lost. His lost commentaries entitled In regum are known to have been dedicated to Humphrey of Lancaster, 1st Duke of Gloucester and to John Low, prior-provincial of the Augustinians in 1427–1433 and later a bishop. Capgrave was present when the foundation stone of King's College, Cambridge was laid on 2 April 1441 by Henry VI. Several hagiographies and royal biographies followed, including one in English of St Katharine. By 1446 he was Prior of the Augustinian friary at Bishop's Lynn.

Capgrave paid a visit to Rome in 1449–1450 for the holy year of Jubilee and left an account that provides a glimpse into the histories, legends, traditions and public attitudes in the church at that time. Some later works were dedicated to William Grey, King's Proctor in Rome in 1450 and later Bishop of Ely.

Only twelve of Capgrave's 45 known works survive, including the seven in English. The  was printed by Wynkyn de Worde in 1516 and again in 1527. Perhaps the most important for posterity was his Abbreviacion of Cronicles, which provides a frame for world history within an Augustinian framework, drawing on the St Albans chronicles by Thomas Walsingham and others. According to the Encyclopedia of Medieval Literature, the book "brings together what Capgrave felt were the most important events in world and later English history. He often moralized on historical incidents and consistently revealed a bias for Christians and later Englishmen in his depiction of events." His , completed between 1446 and 1453, was a collection of lives of German emperors (918–1198), English kings (1100–1446) and other famous Henries in various parts of the world (1031–1406).

Capgrave died on 12 August 1464 at Bishop's Lynn.

References

Further reading

1393 births
1464 deaths
15th-century English historians
English theologians
Writers from King's Lynn
English male non-fiction writers